Hayseed Dixie is an American band formed in Nashville, Tennessee, in 2000. Their first album was A Hillbilly Tribute to AC/DC. The band performs bluegrass cover versions of hard rock songs and also original songs of a mostly satirical or absurdist nature in a self-created musical genre which the band calls "rockgrass." The band's name is a linguistic play on the name of the band AC/DC.

Career
Hayseed Dixie plays hard rock and bluegrass music on electrified acoustic bluegrass instruments. The band has released 16 studio albums and played over 1,400 live dates in 31 different countries since its inception in 2000.

Upon the release of the debut album, A Hillbilly Tribute to AC/DC, on April 17, 2001, which consisted of acoustic hillbilly-styled reworkings of AC/DC songs, Hayseed Dixie received considerable morning-show radio airplay in the US, selling over 250,000 albums in the US from 2001 to 2003. The band toured the US club and festival circuit extensively during that time. In March 2003, the band had three different albums in the Top 15 in the bluegrass category of the US Billboard charts at the same time. Western Europe, however, has shown the group the most enduring appreciation.

Since 2001, the band has produced 15 further themed albums in the "rockgrass" style, composed of both hillbilly-esque reworkings of classic rock songs and original material which is mainly satirical in nature.

Hayseed Dixie has performed at major European folk and rock music festivals, including an appearance opening the main stage at Glastonbury in 2005. In September 2005 they held their own festival, called Loopallu, in the small coastal town of Ullapool, Scotland, which has since become an annual event, though they are no longer involved with it.

In June 2007 Hayseed Dixie appeared on the opening day of the Download Festival and played at the Roskilde Festival in Denmark in July 2007. In October 2010, the band played a four-night stand called Hayfest: Tour of Glasgow, Scotland performing four consecutive themed nights (drinking, cheating, killing and hell songs respectively) in the Scottish city with no songs repeated, thus playing over eight hours of music in four nights. Hayseed Dixie made a three-consecutive-night appearance at the Wacken Open Air Festival in Germany in 2011, playing three entirely different sets of material each night.

Hayseed Dixie released an album on April 11, 2011, composed almost entirely of songs in the Norwegian language, titled Sjt Munchs Drikkeklubb Band. The group also charted a single in the summer of 2011 in Finland called "Juodaan Viinaa," (a cover version of a song by Finnish musician Hector) which loosely translates to "Let's Drink Booze!" sung entirely in Finnish. Hayseed Dixie have also recorded several songs in German, among them a cover of Rammstein's "Mein Teil" and an original drinking song called "Die Richtige Zeit für Schwarzbier," (English translation: "The Right Time for Black Beer") as well as one song in Spanish. With the exception of the 2006 Halloween EP, You Wanna See Something REALLY Scary? which was recorded in Scotland, all of Hayseed Dixie's albums have been recorded by John Wheeler at Renaissance Recording, Nashville, Tennessee, entirely in the analogue recording format.

BBC Radio 2's Jeremy Vine is a fan of their work and originally championed them at national radio in the UK. The group wrote and recorded the "When you wanna hear great music..." jingle for his daily radio show. They also performed twice in 2005 on the BBC Television show Top of the Pops and on the 2014 Jools Holland's Hootenanny on New Year's Eve.

Kerosene Brothers was an alter-ego project of the band; they released the album Choose Your Own Title under that name in 2003 on Koch Records. John Wheeler has released two solo albums on the Cooking Vinyl label, the first titled Un-American Gothic, in February 2013, and the second, titled "Difficult #2 Album," in January 2016, as well as an EP of southern rock songs, titled Daydreams About Night Things, in January 2018.

Longtime mainstay members, Dale Reno and Don Wayne Reno, left Hayseed Dixie at the end of 2013 to form a traditional bluegrass group called Reno and Harrell, which released an album called Reno Bound in September 2013. Joining Hayseed Dixie in January 2014 in the roles of banjo and mandolin were Johnny Butten (holder of the Guinness world record title for fastest banjo player) and Hippy Joe Hymas. In 2018, Hymas appeared in the documentary New Town Utopia.

The studio album Hair Down to My Grass was released on January 12, 2015, worldwide and spent three weeks at the number one spot on the UK Country Chart. The band launched the new album in the UK with a performance of "Eye of the Tiger" on the Jools Holland Hootenanny New Year's Eve BBC TV show.

A new album, titled Free Your Mind and Your Grass Will Follow was released in April 2017.

In 2020, the band released "Blast From the Grassed" and in 2021, an album of original, outlaw country oriented songs titled "Shattered Grass".

Current band members
 John Wheeler (credited as Barley Scotch) – vocals, acoustic guitar, violin, mandolin, piano
 Hippy Joe Hymas – mandolin, acoustic guitar
 Jake "Bakesnake" Byers – acoustic bass guitar
 Tim Carter - banjo

Former band members
 Rusty Horn (as Cooter Brown) – acoustic guitar
 Kurt Carrick (as Kletus) – acoustic bass
 Mike Daly (as Wilson Cook) – Dobro
 Jason D Smith – bass
 Jeff Williams – bass
 Chad Mize – bass
 Dave Harrison - percussion
 Nick Buda - percussion
 Don Wayne Reno - banjo
 Dale Reno - mandolin
 Johnny Butten – banjo

Discography

Videography
2006: No Sleep Till Liverpool (DVD) – A 2005 concert tour to support A Hot Piece of Grass. Includes a cover of AC/DC's "Hells Bells", several music videos and a segment about the origins of the band.

References

Other sources

External links
Official website
Hayseed Dixie collection at the Internet Archive's live music archive.

AC/DC
American bluegrass music groups
American parodists
Cover bands
Parody musicians
American southern rock musical groups
Tribute bands
Musical groups established in 2001
Comedy rock musical groups
Rock music groups from Tennessee
Dualtone Records artists
Cooking Vinyl artists